Paraclinus naeorhegmis, the Surf blenny, is a species of labrisomid blenny endemic to the Bahamas where it occurs in eroded limestone shorelines.  This species can reach a length of  TL.

References

naeorhegmis
Fish described in 1960